A-flat minor is a minor scale based on A, consisting of the pitches A, B, C, D, E, F, and G. Its key signature has seven flats. Its relative major is C-flat major (or enharmonically B major), its parallel major is A-flat major, and its enharmonic equivalent is G-sharp minor.

The A-flat natural minor scale is:

Changes needed for the melodic and harmonic versions of the scale are written in with accidentals as necessary. The A-flat harmonic minor and melodic minor scales are:

Music in A-flat minor 
Although A-flat minor occurs in modulation in works in other keys, it is only rarely used as the principal key of a piece of music. Some well-known uses of the key in classical and romantic piano music include:
 The Funeral March in Ludwig van Beethoven's Piano Sonata No. 12, Op. 26.
 An early section of the last movement of Beethoven's Piano Sonata No. 31, Op. 110 (although the key signature of this section uses only 6 flats, not 7).
 The second Trio in Franz Schubert's Klavierstücke in E-flat major for Piano, D946/2.
 Schubert's Impromptu in A♭ major actually begins in A♭ minor, though this is written as A♭ major with accidentals.
 The first piece "Aime-moi" ("Love me") from Charles-Valentin Alkan's Trois morceaux dans le genre pathétique
 Max Bruch's Concerto for Two Pianos and Orchestra, Op. 88a, although the piece ends in A-flat Major.
 The Evocación from Book I of Isaac Albéniz's Iberia.
 Isaac Albéniz's La Vega.
 Etude No.13 in Moritz Moszkowski's Études de Virtuosité, Op. 72, although it ends in A-flat major.
 Leoš Janáček uses it for his Violin Sonata and the organ solo of his Glagolitic Mass.
 The opening of Igor Stravinsky's The Firebird.
 Franz Liszt's original version of "La campanella" from Grandes études de Paganini, which was subsequently rewritten in G-sharp minor.
 In Gustav Mahler's Ninth Symphony, there is a particularly aggressive restatement of the introduction of the third movement in A-flat minor.
  The first movement of Charles Koechlin's Partita for Chamber Orchestra, Op. 205, is in A-flat minor, and the earlier A-flat-minor portion is written with a 7-flat key signature, but the later A-flat-minor portion is written without any key signature, and uses the necessary flats as accidentals.
 It is also used in Frederick Loewe's score to the 1956 musical play My Fair Lady; the Second Servants' Chorus is set in A-flat minor (the preceding and following choruses being a semitone lower and higher respectively).
 The string quartet opus 105  by Dvorak opens in A-flat minor.

More often, pieces in a minor mode that have A-flat's pitch as tonic are notated in the enharmonic key, G-sharp minor, because that key has just five sharps as opposed to the seven flats of A-flat minor.

In some scores, the A-flat minor key signature in the bass clef is written with the flat for the F on the second line from the top.

Notes

References

External links
 Overview of Compositions with 7 Accidentals

Musical keys
Minor scales